Evgeny Mishin (born February 21, 1976 in Otradnoye, Russia) is an IFBB professional bodybuilder from Russia. He has since gained wider recognition as an actor in commercials for Applegate's Organic Meats, NY Lottery Powerball TV commercial, Coca-Cola Superball TV commercial, Elder Plan TV commercial and TV shows Power on Starz, The Punisher on Netflix, and The Blacklist on ABC. He now resides in New York. His occupation is personal trainer, professional bodybuilder, model, and actor.

He stands 6'2" and weighs 290 lbs. in-season and 350 lbs. off-season.

Contest history 
 2011 IFBB Mr. Olympia - 17th
 2011 IFBB Europa Pro - 3rd
 2010 IFBB Mr. Olympia - 17th
 2010 IFBB Europa Pro - 3rd
 2010 IFBB New York Pro - 6th 
 2010 IFBB Europa Pro - 3rd
 2009 IFBB New York Pro - 8th
 2008 IFBB New York Pro - 15th
 2008 IFBB Houston Pro - 10th 
 2006 IFBB Ironman - 17th
 2006 San Francisco - 17th
 2006 Colorado - 17th
 2006 New York Pro - 18th
 2004 IFBB Night of Champions - 19th
 2003 IFBB Night of Champions - 20th
 2002 Championship of Europe - 1st
 2002 Championship of Russia - 1st
 2002 Championship of Russia (Spring) - 1st
 2002 Championship of Russia (Autumn) - 1st (couples posing)
 1997 International Championship of Powerlifting - 2nd
 1997 Championship of Russia (Powerlifting) - 1st
 1995 Championship of Russia (Powerlifting) - 1st

See also 

 List of male professional bodybuilders
 List of female professional bodybuilders
 Mr. Olympia

References

External links
 Official Website
 Evgeny Mishin
 Evgeny Mishin
 

1976 births
Living people
Professional bodybuilders
Russian bodybuilders
Fellows of the American Physical Society